The Maple Fire was a wildfire on Jefferson Ridge in the Olympic Mountains, approximately 23 miles north of Shelton, Washington in the United States. The fire was caused by illegal logging activities, and the resulting criminal trial was the first time that tree DNA has ever been used in a federal trial in the United States.

Fire
The Maple Fire was started by a crew of timber poachers who were attempting to steal Big-Leaf Maple trees from the Olympic National Park. The crew discovered a potential target tree on August 3, but were unable to harvest it due to a wasp nest at the base of the tree. After failing to exterminate the nest with insecticides, the crew deliberately set fire to the nest. The fire grew out of control, and the logging crew fled.

The fire was reported the following day, August 4. It was not considered contained until October 10, and continued to smolder until seasonal rains finally extinguished it in November. The Maple Fire ultimately burned  of wildland. A command center was initially established at nearby Brinnon, Washington, but quickly grew too large, and was relocated to Shelton, Washington.  At one point, as many as 258 personnel were involved in firefighting efforts. Some unmanned aerial vehicles, and two Washington Air National Guard helicopters were also dispatched to combat the blaze. The firefighting efforts cost $4.5 million.

Criminal proceedings
One member of the illegal logging crew pleaded guilty to theft of public property and setting timber afire in December 2019. He was sentenced to 30 months in prison in September 2020.  After a 6 day jury trial in July 2021, another member of the crew was convicted of conspiracy, theft of public property, depredation of public property, trafficking in unlawfully harvested timber, and attempting to traffic in unlawfully harvested timber. He was sentenced to 20 months in prison in November 2021.

Key evidence in the jury trial was DNA samples from wood the crew had sold to nearby mills. These samples were compared with samples in a database of Big Leaf Maple DNA. Analysis showed a very high likely-hood that the wood had been poached. This was the first time that tree DNA had ever been used in a federal trial.

References

2018 Washington (state) wildfires
Jefferson County, Washington
August 2018 events in the United States
September 2018 events in the United States
October 2018 events in the United States